Ustad Zakir Hussain (born 9 March 1951) is an Indian tabla player, composer, percussionist, music producer and film actor. He is the eldest son of tabla player Alla Rakha.

He was awarded the Padma Shri in 1988, the Padma Bhushan in 2002, and the Padma Vibhushan in 2023, by the Government of India. He was also awarded the Govt of India's Sangeet Natak Akademi Award in 1990, Fellowship of the Sangeet Natak Akademi Fellowship, Ratna Sadsya in 2018. In 1999, he was awarded the United States National Endowment for the Arts' National Heritage Fellowship, the highest award given to traditional artists and musicians.

Early life and education

Hussain attended St. Michael's High School in Mahim, and was graduated from the St. Xavier's College, Mumbai.

Career 

Hussain played on George Harrison's 1973 album Living in the Material World and John Handy's 1973 album Hard Work. He also performed on Van Morrison's 1979 album Into the Music and Earth, Wind & Fire's 1983 album Powerlight.

Mickey Hart of the Grateful Dead, who had known Hussain since the 1960s, invited him to create the special album Planet Drum, featuring drummers from different parts of the world. Featured along with Hussain, from India, was Vikku Vinayakram, with whom Hussain had collaborated in Shakti. The first Planet Drum album, released in 1991 on the Rykodisc label, went on to earn the 1992 Grammy Award for Best World Music Album, the first Grammy ever awarded in this category. The Global Drum Project album and tour brought Mickey Hart, Hussain, Sikiru Adepoju, and Giovanni Hidalgo together again in a reunion sparked by the 15th anniversary of the Planet Drum album. The album Global Drum Project won the Grammy Award for Best Contemporary World Music Album at the 51st Grammy Awards Ceremony held on 8 February 2009.

Hussain composed, performed and acted as Indian music advisor for the Malayalam film Vanaprastham, a 1999 Cannes Film Festival entry which was nominated for the Grand Jury Prize at the AFI Los Angeles International Film Festival (AFI Fest) in 1999, and won awards at 2000 Istanbul International Film Festival (Turkey), 2000 Mumbai International Film Festival (India), and 2000 National Film Awards (India). He has composed soundtracks for several movies, most notably In Custody and The Mystic Masseur by Ismail Merchant, and has played tabla on the soundtracks of Francis Coppola's Apocalypse Now, Bernardo Bertolucci's Little Buddha, and other films.
He starred in several films specifically showcasing his musical performance both solo and with different bands, including the 1998 documentary Zakir and His Friends, and the documentary The Speaking Hand: Zakir Hussain and the Art of the Indian Drum (2003 Sumantra Ghosal). Hussain co-starred as Inder Lal in the 1983 Merchant Ivory film Heat and Dust, for which he was an associate music director.

Hussain is a founding member of Bill Laswell's world music supergroup Tabla Beat Science.

In 2016, Hussain was amongst many musicians invited by President Obama to the International Jazz Day 2016 All-Star Global Concert at the White House.

Haridas Vhatkar has been making Hussain's tablas for more than 18 years. Haridas said he learned how to make tabla so he could specially make them for Hussain.

Hussain has stated that he does not play at private gatherings, corporate events, or weddings; he believes music should not be heard at events where folks come to socialize, drink or enjoy a meal (music should be the sole purpose of the event).

Book 
Nasreen Munni Kabir compiled 15 interview sessions (each lasting about 2 hours) from 2016 to 2017 into the book Zakir Hussain: A Life in Music, which was published in 2018. This book takes the reader through Hussain's life from his youth, his years of intense training, and growth as a musician.

Personal life
Hussain married Antonia Minnecola, a Kathak dancer and teacher, who is also his manager. They have two daughters, Anisa Qureshi and Isabella Qureshi. Anisa graduated from UCLA and is trying her hand in video production and film making. Isabella is studying dance in Manhattan.

Hussain has two brothers: Taufiq Qureshi, a percussionist and Fazal Qureshi, also a tabla player. Their brother Munawar died at a young age when he was attacked by a rabid dog. His eldest sister Bilquis died before Hussain was born. Another sister, Razia, died due to complications during a cataract surgery, just a few hours before their father's death in 2000. He has another sister named Khurshid.

He was named an Old Dominion Fellow by the Humanities Council at Princeton University, where he resided for the 2005–2006 semester as full professor in the music department. He was also a visiting professor at Stanford University. In May 2022, he was conferred the honorary Doctor of Law (LLD) degree for his contribution to the field of music by Mumbai University.

Discography

 Evening Ragas (1970) Vasant Rai
 Shanti (1971)
 Rolling Thunder (1972) – Mickey Hart
 Shakti (1975) – Shakti with John McLaughlin
 Karuna Supreme (MPS, 1976) - John Handy with Ali Akbar Khan
 Hard Work - John Handy (ABC/Impulse, 1976)
 A Handful of Beauty (1976) – Shakti with John McLaughlin
 Diga (1976) – Diga Rhythm Band
 Natural Elements (1977) – Shakti with John McLaughlin
 Morning Ragas (1979) with Vasant Rai
 Who's to Know (1980) – L. Shankar
 Song for Everyone (1985) – L. Shankar
 Making Music (1987) with Jan Garbarek, John McLaughlin and Hariprasad Chaurasia
 Tabla Duet (1988) – Zakir Hussain & Alla Rakha
 Venu (1989) – Hariprasad Chaurasia & Zakir Hussain
 At the Edge (1990) – Mickey Hart
 Maestro's Choice Series One (1991) – Alla Rakha
 Planet Drum (1991) – Mickey Hart
 When Words Disappear (1991) – David Trasoff & Zakir Hussain
 Flights of Improvisation (1992)
 Sangeet Sartaj (1992)
 The One and Only (1992)
 Zakir Hussain and the Rhythm Experience (1992)
 Music of the Deserts (1993)
 Rag Madhuvanti / Rag Misra Tilang (1993) – Shivkumar Sharma
 Concert for Peace (1993) – Ravi Shankar
 Jog And Rageshri (1994)
 Ustad Amjad Ali Khan & Zakir Hussain (1994) – Amjad Ali Khan & Zakir Hussain
 Golden Krithis Colours – (1994) – Kunnakudi Vaidyanathan
 Raga Aberi (1995) – Shankar
 Maestro's Choice – Series Two (1995) – Sultan Khan & Zakir Hussain
 World Network Series, Vol. 1: India- Raga Purya Kalyan (1995) – Zakir Hussain & Shivkumar Sharma
 The Elements – Space (1996)
 Mickey Hart's Mystery Box (1996) – Mickey Hart
 Kirwani (1997)
 Magical Moments of Rhythm (1997)
 And the Rhythm Experience (1998)
 Essence of Rhythm (1998)
 Night Spinner (1998) – George Brooks (Moment Records)
 Supralingua (1998) – Mickey Hart
 Fire Dance (1998) collaboration with Pat Martino
 Save Our Children (1998) - Pharoah Sanders
 Remember Shakti (1999) – Remember Shakti
 Spirit into Sound (1999) – Mickey Hart
 The Believer (2000) – Remember Shakti
 Tala Matrix (2000) – Tabla Beat Science
 Golden Strings of the Sarode (2001) – Aashish Khan & Zakir Hussain
 Saturday Night in Bombay (2001) – Remember Shakti (Universal Records)
 Selects (2002)
 Summit (2002) – George Brooks (Earth Brothers Music BMI)
 The Best of Mickey Hart: Over the Edge and Back (2002) – Mickey Hart
 Live in San Francisco at Stern Grove (2002) – Tabla Beat Science
 Ustad Mohammad Omar: Virtuoso from Afghanistan (2002)- Zakir Hussain
 Energy (2003)
 Live at Miles Davis Hall (8 July 2004) – Remember Shakti
 Live at 38th Montreux Jazz Festival (18 July 2004) – Remember Shakti
 Punjabi Dhamar (2004)
 Raag Chandrakauns (2004)
 Sangam (2006) – Jazz collaboration with bandleader Charles Lloyd.
 Soukha (2006) – V. Selvaganesh (with John McLaughlin, Zakir Hussain, Vikku, Shrinivas) – Naive
 Global Drum Project (2007) – Mickey Hart, Zakir Hussain, Imran Hussain, Chandan Sharma Sikiru Adepoju, Giovanni Hidalgo – Shout Factory
 The Melody of Rhythm (2009) – Bela Fleck, Zakir Hussain, Edgar Meyer
 Venu (2011)  Hariprasad Chaurasia, Zakir Hussain
 Mysterium Tremendum (2012) – Mickey Hart Band
 Good Hope (2019) – Dave Holland, Zakir Hussain, Chris Potter
 Is That So? (2020) – John McLaughlin, Shankar Mahadevan, Zakir Hussain
 In the Groove (2022) – Planet Drum

Filmography

 Heat and Dust (1983) Merchant Ivory Film
 The Perfect Murder (1988) Merchant Ivory Film
 Thanduvitaen Ennai (1991 Tamil movie, cameo role)
 Miss Beatty's Children  (1992)
 Saaz (1998)
 Zakir and His Friends (1998)
 The Speaking Hand: Zakir Hussain and the Art of the Indian Drum (2003) Sumantra Ghosal
 Talamanam Sound Clash – Further Adventures in Hype (2003 – DVD) – Tabla Beat Science
 The Way of Beauty (2006 – DVD) – Remember Shakti
 The Rhythm Devils Concert Experience (2008 – DVD) – The Rhythm Devils
 Manto (2018)

Soundtracks

 In Custody (1993)
 Little Buddha (1993)
 Saaz (1998)
 Vanaprastham (1999)
 The Mystic Masseur (2001)
 Mr. and Mrs. Iyer (2002)
 One Dollar Curry (2003)

Awards and honours
 Hussain was awarded the titles of Padma Shri in 1988, Padma Bhushan in 2002, and Padma Vibhushan in 2023.
 Awarded the Indo-American Award in 1990 in recognition for his outstanding cultural contribution to relations between the United States and India.
 Presented with the Sangeet Natak Akademi Award in 1990 by the President of India, making him one of the youngest musicians to receive this recognition given by the Sangeet Natak Academy, India's National Academy of Music, Dance & Drama.
 In 1992 Planet Drum, an album co-created and produced by Hussain and Mickey Hart, was awarded the first-ever Grammy for Best World Music Album, the Downbeat Critics’ Poll for Best World Beat Album and the NARM Indie Best Seller Award for a World Music Recording.
 Recipient of a 1999 National Heritage Fellowship from the National Endowment for the Arts, the United States government's honour for a master in the traditional arts, presented by First Lady Hillary Clinton at the United States Senate on 28 September 1999.
 In 2005, he was named an Old Dominion Fellow by the Humanities Council at Princeton University, where he resided for the 2005–2006 semester as full professor in the music department, teaching a survey course in Indian classical music and dance.
 Recipient of the Kalidas Samman in 2006, an award for artists of exceptional achievement, from the Government of Madhya Pradesh.
 Golden Strings of the Sarode (Moment! Records 2006) with Aashish Khan and Hussain was nominated for a Grammy in the Best Traditional World Music Album category in 2006.
 In 2007, readers' polls from both Modern Drummer and Drum! magazines named Hussain Best World Music and Best World Beat Drummer respectively.
 On 8 February 2009 for 51st Grammy Awards, Hussain won the Grammy in the Contemporary World Music Album category for his collaborative album "Global Drum Project" along with Mickey Hart, Sikiru Adepoju & Giovanni Hidalgo.
 On 23 February 2012 for Guru Gangadhar Pradhan Lifetime Achievement Award at Konark Dance & Music Festival, Organised by Konark Natya Mandap
Summer of 2016, he was nominated for President's Medal of the Arts, however, new rule stated non-Americans could not receive the medal.
On 18 January 2017, San Francisco Jazz Center gave Hussain a Lifetime Achievement Award
In 2019, Sangeet Natak Academy, India's National Academy of Music, Dance & Drama, honored Hussain with the Academy Fellow award, also known as the Academy Ratna, for the year 2018.
In 2022, he was conferred the honorary Doctor of Law (LLD) degree for his exceptional contribution in the field of music by Mumbai University.
On 17 June 2022, he was named by the non-profit Inamori Foundation to receive the Kyoto Prize, Japan's highest private award for global achievement, in the category of Arts and Philosophy (field: Music).

Tribute 
The line "Zakir Hussain Tabela Ivaltana" in the Tamil song "Telephone Manipol" in Indian (1996) film directed by S.Shankar is a tribute to him. This song was written by poet Vairamuthu.

See also
Alla Rakha

References

External links

 His website
 

1951 births
Living people
Indian drummers
Indian Muslims
Indian percussionists
Musicians from Mumbai
Tabla players
Tabla gharanas
Instrumental gharanas
Hindustani instrumentalists
Jazz fusion musicians
World music musicians
Indian male film actors
Indian male classical musicians
St. Xavier's College, Mumbai alumni
Indian film score composers
Recipients of the Padma Shri in arts
Recipients of the Padma Bhushan in arts
Recipients of the Sangeet Natak Akademi Award
National Heritage Fellowship winners
Hindustani composers
University of Washington alumni
Indian male film score composers
Male jazz musicians
Shakti (band) members
Remember Shakti members
Edition Records artists
Recipients of the Sangeet Natak Akademi Fellowship
Recipients of the Padma Vibhushan in arts